The 1959 Bathurst 100 was a motor race staged at the Mount Panorama Circuit, Bathurst, New South Wales, Australia on 30 March 1959. The race, which was promoted by the Australian Racing Drivers Club Ltd., was contested over 26 laps, a total distance of 100 miles. It was race 5 of 12 in the 1959 Australian Drivers' Championship.

The race was won by New Zealander Ross Jensen driving a Maserati 250F.

Results

 DNF = Did not finish
 DNS = Did not start

Notes
 Fastest lap: Alec Mildren (Cooper), 2:48.9

References

Bathurst 100
Motorsport in Bathurst, New South Wales